The 2003–04 Argentine Torneo Argentino A was the ninth season of third division professional football in Argentina. A total of 20 teams competed; the champion was promoted to Primera B Nacional.

Club information

Zone A

Zone B

Zone C

Zone D

Apertura 2003

First stage
In every round the bye team played against the bye team of the other zone: Team from Zone A vs Team from Zone B and Team from Zone C vs Team from Zone D.

Zone A

Zone B

Zone C

Zone D

Final stage

Note: The team in the first line plays at home the second leg.

Clausura 2004

First stage
In every round the bye team played against the bye team of the other zone: Team from Zone A vs Team from Zone B and Team from Zone C vs Team from Zone D.

Zone A

Zone B

Zone C

Zone D

Final stage

Note: The team in the first line plays at home the second leg.

Overall standings

Championship final

Promotion/relegation playoff B Nacional-Torneo Argentino A

 

CAI remained in the Torneo Argentino A after a 1-1 aggregate tie by virtue of a "sports advantage". In case of a tie in goals, the team from the Torneo Argentino A gets to stay in it.

Relegation playoff

|-
!colspan="5"|Relegation/promotion playoff 1

|-
!colspan="5"|Relegation/promotion playoff 2

Rosario Puerto Belgrano was promoted to 2004–05 Torneo Argentino A by winning the playoff and Racing (O) was relegated to 2004–05 Torneo Argentino B.
Gimnasia y Tiro remained in the Torneo Argentino A by winning the playoff.

See also
2003–04 in Argentine football

References

Torneo Argentino A seasons
3